The 2015 World RX of Argentina was the thirteenth round of the second season of the FIA World Rallycross Championship. The event was held at the Autódromo Municipal Juan Manuel Fangio in Rosario, Santa Fe, over one day following the declaration of unsafe track conditions on the first scheduled day of competition. This led to the first World Championship event to be held over only three heats. Petter Solberg secured his second consecutive title having only needed to advance to the semi-finals to achieve it.

Heats

Note - Heat 4 was cancelled as a result of the one-day format.

Semi-finals

Semi-final 1

Semi-final 2

Final

Championship standings after the event

References

External links

|- style="text-align:center"
|width="35%"|Previous race:2015 World RX of Italy
|width="30%"|FIA World Rallycross Championship2015 season
|width="35%"|Next race:2016 World RX of Portugal
|- style="text-align:center"
|width="35%"|Previous race:2014 World RX of Argentina
|width="30%"|World RX of Argentina
|width="35%"|Next race:2016 World RX of Argentina
|- style="text-align:center"

Argentina
World RX